The 2020 season was Negeri Sembilan's 97th year in their history and 8th season in Malaysia Premier League since it was first introduced in 2004. Also it was the second season in the Malaysia Premier League since 2019 following relegation 2018 season. Along with the league, the club also participated in the Malaysia FA Cup and the Malaysia Cup.

Events
The club has confirmed to retain all four foreign players from previous season for upcoming 2020 season.

On 9 February 2020, the club has launched the new kits and jerseys.

Competitions

Malaysia Premier League

League table

Statistics

Appearances and goals

 
 

                             
|-
! colspan="16" style="background:#dcdcdc; text-align:center"| Players transferred out during the season
|-                          
|}

References

Negeri Sembilan FA seasons
Negeri Sembilan